The Church of Saint-Maclou is a Roman Catholic church in Rouen, France, named after the Saint Malo, which is considered one of the best examples of the Flamboyant style of Gothic architecture in France. 
Saint-Maclou, along with Rouen Cathedral, the Palais de Justice (also Flamboyant), and the Church of St. Ouen, form a famous ensemble of significant Gothic buildings in Rouen. Its spire reaches a height of 83 meters.

Architecture
Construction on Saint-Maclou began sometime after 1435; it was to replace an existing Romanesque parish church that had suffered from several years of neglect resulting in a collapsed transept roof. In its place, master mason Pierre Robin created a basilica style church with four radiating chapels around an octagonal choir. The decoration of the church is macabre, beckoning back to the church's grim past rooted in the Black Death pandemic. The transept is non-projecting complete with piers that support the above lantern tower.  The choir is rather large in size for the structure and has two bays and four radiating chapels that branch off from the ambulatory.  Overall, the plan places its emphasis on the transept which is midway between the choir and the nave.  Saint-Maclou has the classic three-story elevation of an arcade, triforium, and clerestory.  The famous western facade is towerless with five gabled porches with flying buttresses above the aisles that are attached to the western wall featuring a rose window.

The Church of Saint Maclou was built during the transition from the late Gothic period (15th - 16th century) to the Renaissance in the 16th century. The space above a portal within the arch is referred to as the tympanum. Typically, the tympanum is filled with sculpture of a scene alluding to Heaven and Hell. The tympanum of the main entrance of the Church of Saint Maclou displays Christ standing with his hands held out to people surrounding him, those to his right heading for Heaven and those to his left heading for the fiery pits of Hell. This message, commonly depicted during the Gothic period, was designed to scare and evoke emotion from the public. The architectural plan of the church of Saint-Maclou includes radiating chapels. Saint-Maclou, like most Gothic churches, had many exterior stone statues; however, they suffered much of the French wars of religion, weather conditions, and pollution. Most inside statues disappeared during the French revolution. Nevertheless, the chapels inside had kept their wooden furniture and decorations made in the 18th century, but most of them were destroyed during the allied bombings in 1944. The church was partly damaged by the falling of two bombs. Concerning the Renaissance outside doors with their carvings and the Renaissance organ, they escaped destruction both during the French revolution and the Second World War.

Patrons
The patrons of Saint-Maclou were of the wealthy merchant class that had experienced an immense social and economic growth during the fourteenth and fifteenth centuries.  The family most closely associated with the rebuilding of the church was the Dufour family.  The patrons were responsible for the selection of the master mason, Pierre Robin, as well as for part of the overall style of the church.  The Dufours and others are cited as being the impetus behind the similarities between Saint-Maclou and Rouen Cathedral.

Gallery

References

Bibliography
 Linda Elaine Neagley, "Elegant Simplicity: The Late Gothic Design of St.-Maclou in Rouen", The Art Bulletin, Vol. 74, No. 3 (1992): 395-422. https://www.jstor.org/stable/3045890
 Linda Elaine Neagley, "The Flamboyant Architecture of St.-Maclou, Rouen, and the Development of a Style", The Journal of the Society of Architectural Historians, Vol. 47, No. 4 (1988): 374-396. https://www.jstor.org/stable/990382
 Linda Elaine Neagley, "Late Gothic Architecture and Vision: Representation, Scenography, and Illusionism", in Reading Gothic Architecture, ed. Matthew M. Reeve (Turnhout: Brepols, 2008), 37-55.
 Linda Elaine Neagley, Disciplined Exuberance: The Parish Church of Saint-Maclou and Late Gothic Architecture in Rouen. University Park, Penn: The Pennsylvania State University Press, 1998.

External links

15th-century Roman Catholic church buildings in France
Gothic architecture in France
Roman Catholic churches in Rouen
Roman Catholic churches completed in 1521